Jean Barbier d'Aucour (1 September 1641, Langres – 3 September 1694, Paris) was a French lawyer to the parliament of Paris, ardent Jansenist and satirist. He wrote anti-Jesuit pamphlets in prose and verse (he had formerly studied under the Jesuits).

Publications 
Publications by Jean Barbier d'Aucour on WikiSource
, 1664
, 1665
, 1671
, 1674
, 1680
', 1688

1641 births
1694 deaths
People from Langres
French satirists
17th-century French lawyers
Members of the Académie Française
French male non-fiction writers